Siegfried Lefanczik (4 July 1930 – February 2016) was a German racewalker. He competed in the 1958 European Athletics Championships and placed 7th out of 598 competitors. He later competed in the men's 20 kilometres walk at the 1960 Summer Olympics but was disqualified only 3 km (1.86 mi) from the finish line.

References

1930 births
2016 deaths
Athletes (track and field) at the 1960 Summer Olympics
German male racewalkers
Olympic athletes of the United Team of Germany
Place of birth missing